Keyvan Rural District is in the Central District of Khoda Afarin County, East Azerbaijan province, Iran. At the National Census of 2006, its population was 2,905 in 682 households, when it was in the former Khoda Afarin District of Kaleybar County. There were 2,423 inhabitants in 692 households at the following census of 2011, by which time Khoda Afarin County had been established. At the most recent census of 2016, the population of the rural district was 2,068 in 698 households. The largest of its 35 villages was Zanbalan, with 330 people.

References 

Khoda Afarin County

Rural Districts of East Azerbaijan Province

Populated places in East Azerbaijan Province

Populated places in Khoda Afarin County